The 30th Hundred Flowers Awards was a ceremony held on October 16, 2010 in Jianyin, Jiangsu province. The nominees were announced on September 22.

Awards and nominations

Best Film

Best Director

Best Actor

Best Actress

Best Supporting Actor

Best Supporting Actress

References

External links
 The 30th Hundred Flowers Awards Official Site
 Sina.com Official Page

2010